Nikolay Yevgenyevich Yefimov (born 23 January 1984) is a former Russian football defender.

Career
Yefimov spent two seasons with Zenit U-21 team. He made his professional debut for Zenit on 5 September 2003 in the Russian Premier League Cup semi-final against Torpedo Moscow. From 2006 to 2008 he played for a number of Russian Second Division clubs including Metallurg-Kuzbass and Zenit-2.

External links
  Profile at stats.sportbox.ru
 
 

Russian footballers
1984 births
Living people
FC Zenit Saint Petersburg players
Association football defenders
FC Novokuznetsk players
FC Zenit-2 Saint Petersburg players